These are the Oricon number one albums of 2004, per the Oricon Albums Chart.

Chart history

Trivia
Number-one album of 2004: Utada Hikaru Single Collection Vol. 1 by Hikaru Utada.
Most weeks at number-one: Hikaru Utada with a total of 5 weeks (6 weeks if included their English album Exodus release under their alias Utada).

External links

See also
2004 in music

Japan albums
Lists of number-one albums in Japan
2004 in Japanese music